Georges Lourau (1898–1974) was a French film producer active from the 1930s to the 1960s. During the 1930s he was the director of Tobis Filmsonor, the French subsidiary of Germany company Tobis Film based at Epinay Studios in Paris. In the postwar era he was associated with the distribution outfit Cinédis, producing four films directed by Henri-Georges Clouzot. He was also a president of Unifrance. He was a member of the jury at the 1937 Venice Film Festival and the 1967 Cannes Film Festival.

Selected filmography
 Here's Berlin (1932)
 Final Accord (1938)
 Patrie (1946)
 Under the Sky of Paris (1951)
 Messalina (1951)
 Holiday for Henrietta (1952)
 Lucrèce Borgia (1953)
 The Wages of Fear (1953)
 Wild Fruit (1954)
 Madame du Barry (1954)
 Marianne of My Youth (1955)
 Madelon (1955)
 Les Diaboliques (1955)
 Women's Club (1956)
 Le secret de soeur Angèle (1956)
 Les Espions (1957)
 La Parisienne (1957)
 All the Gold in the World (1961)
 The Nina B. Affair (1961)
 Mare matto (1963)
 Shéhérazade (1963)
 La Chasse à l'homme (1964)
 Gibraltar (1964)
 The Night of the Generals (1967)
 Love in the Night (1968)

References

Bibliography
 Lloyd, Christopher. Henri-Georges Clouzot: French Film Directors. Manchester University Press, 2007.
 Roust, Colin. Georges Auric: A Life in Music and Politics. Oxford University Press, 2020.
 Segrave, Kerry. Foreign Films in America: A History. McFarland, 2014.

External links

1898 births
1974 deaths
French film producers
People from Pau, Pyrénées-Atlantiques